Billings Skyview High School, also known as Billings Skyview or Skyview, is a four-year comprehensive public high school in Billings, Montana. The school serves approximately 1,600 students with 92.5 certified staff, 36 support staff and 10 custodians under principal Deb Black, associate principal Danette Cerise, and Deans Scott Lynch and Jay Wahl. It was built in 1987, making it the newest of three public high schools in Billings. Skyview's school colors are Royal Blue, Silver, and White and its mascot is a falcon.

Publications
Yearbook:  Wingspan

Clubs and Activities

Academic Team
Adventure Club
All Nations Indian Club
Anime and Manga Club
ARC Club
Art Club
Artificial Reality Contingency (ARC)
Business Professionals of America (BPA)
Chess Club
Color Guard
Drama Club
Falconeers
FCCLA
Forensics: Speech/Debate
Key Club
Model UN
National Honors Society
Student Council
Students Against Destructive Decisions
Yearbook

Academics
Available AP Courses include

World History
United States History
Psychology
Statistics
Calculus AB
English Language and Composition
English Literature
German Language and Culture
French Language and Culture
Spanish Language and Culture
Biology
Chemistry

Academic Team
Skyview has a successful Academic Team. They have placed first in the Montana Academic State Championship several times. They have also won the Big Sky Regional Science Bowl 3 times, allowing them to participate at a national level.

Notes

External links
Skyview Main Website
Skyview Library Website
 Montana Key Club
Skyview Key Club

Public high schools in Montana
Buildings and structures in Billings, Montana
Schools in Yellowstone County, Montana